Glendale Transportation Center is an Amtrak and Metrolink rail station in the city of Glendale, California. It is served by the Amtrak Pacific Surfliner intercity rail route and the Metrolink Ventura County Line and Metrolink Antelope Valley Line commuter rail routes. Amtrak's Coast Starlight also uses these tracks, but does not stop here.

History 

Originally known as the Glendale Southern Pacific Railroad Depot, it was built by the Southern Pacific Railroad in the California Churrigueresque style of Spanish Colonial Revival architecture in 1923. It had replaced the Atwater Tract Office dating from 1883. The city bought the depot from Southern Pacific in 1989 and acquired adjacent properties to create an intermodal center. Restoration of the historic building and the construction of other elements of the intermodal center cost approximately $6 million.

In May 1997, it was listed on the National Register of Historic Places and has recently undergone an extensive renovation.

Until April 25, 2005, the station was also served by Amtrak's Coast Starlight route.

Connections 
, the following connections are available:
 Amtrak Thruway: 1
 Glendale Beeline: 1, 4, 8, 11, 12

The station also serves as a stop for Greyhound Lines buses, but there is no Greyhound ticketing kiosk or agent.

Future service 
A feasibility study for a streetcar connecting with downtown is underway.

See also 
 Glendale Register of Historic Resources and Historic Districts

References

External links 

Glendale, California
Amtrak stations in Los Angeles County, California
Metrolink stations in Los Angeles County, California
Bus stations in Los Angeles County, California
Public transportation in the San Fernando Valley
Railway stations in the United States opened in 1923
Railway stations on the National Register of Historic Places in California
Buildings and structures on the National Register of Historic Places in Los Angeles County, California
Buildings and structures in Glendale, California
Spanish Colonial Revival architecture in California
Mission Revival architecture in California
1923 establishments in California
Former Southern Pacific Railroad stations in California